Sofia Poumpouridou (born June 12, 1980 in Lugovoye, Jambyl Region, Kazakh SSR) is a retired amateur Greek freestyle wrestler, who competed in the women's lightweight category. Considered one of Europe's top female freestyle wrestlers in her decade, Poumpouridou has yielded a remarkable tally of six career medals, including two golds from the 2001 Mediterranean Games and 2002 World Wrestling Championships. She also had an opportunity to represent the host nation Greece at the 2004 Summer Olympics in Athens, finishing eleventh in the process. Throughout her sporting career, Poumpouridou trained full-time for Ephiridai Wrestling Club in Athens, under her personal coach Andreas Hristodoulakis.

Poumpouridou reached sporting headlines at the 2001 Mediterranean Games in Tunis, Tunisia, where she picked up the gold medal in the women's 51 kg class. When Greece hosted the 2002 World Wrestling Championships in Chalcis, Poumpouridou enchanted the home crowd in a spectacular fashion, as she overwhelmed Japan's Chiharu Icho 3–0 and ran off the mat with another gold in the same division.

When women's wrestling made its debut the 2004 Summer Olympics in Athens, Poumpouridou qualified for the Greek squad in the inaugural 55 kg class. She filled up an entry by the International Federation of Association Wrestling and the Hellenic Olympic Committee, as Greece received an automatic berth for being the host nation. Amassed the home crowd inside Ano Liossia Olympic Hall, Poumpouridou lost her opening match to France's Anna Gomis on technical superiority, and was wretchedly pinned by South Korea's Lee Na-lae that left her on the bottom of the prelim pool. Poumpouridou initially placed last out of twelve female wrestlers in the standings, but later upgraded to eleventh, as Puerto Rico's Mabel Fonseca was disqualified from the tournament after being tested positive for stanozolol.

In 2005, Poumpouridou missed her title defense with a bronze in the women's lightweight category (55 kg) at the Mediterranean Games in Almería, Spain to cap off her sporting career.

References

External links
 

1980 births
Living people
Pontic Greeks
Greek female sport wrestlers
Olympic wrestlers of Greece
Wrestlers at the 2004 Summer Olympics
People from Jambyl Region
World Wrestling Championships medalists
Mediterranean Games gold medalists for Greece
Mediterranean Games bronze medalists for Greece
Competitors at the 2001 Mediterranean Games
Competitors at the 2005 Mediterranean Games
Mediterranean Games medalists in wrestling
European Wrestling Championships medalists
Soviet people of Greek descent
Kazakhstani people of Greek descent
Kazakhstani emigrants to Greece